Vijaya Corea is a radio and television broadcaster and one of Sri Lanka's most well known media personalities. Corea is a household name in Sri Lanka, synonymous with broadcasting and show business for over four decades, and has often been referred to as Sri Lanka's No. 1 Compere.

Early life

He grew up in Colombo, Sri Lanka. Vijaya Corea is the son of Dr. C. V. S. Corea and Amybelle Corea and the half-brother of Siva Obeyesekere the former health minister and Dr. Gamani Corea who was the Secretary-General of the United Nations Conference on Trade and Development and Assistant Secretary-General of the United Nations. Corea's grandfather was the famed freedom fighter of Ceylon, Victor Corea. He is a direct descendant of King Dominicus Corea who was crowned King of Kotte and Sitawaka in 1596 by Vimala Drama Suriya, King of Kandy.

Education

He was educated at the well known educational institution in Sri Lanka – St. Thomas' College, Mount Lavinia. After he left school, Corea was planning to further his studies in Accountancy.

Radio
Corea joined the Commercial Service of Radio Ceylon in 1964, lending his voice to the popular children's program Kiddies Corner.  The American presenter, Craig Thompson, was unwell at the time, so Corea who was visiting Radio Ceylon was asked to step in, by his cousin Vernon Corea, despite having no prior broadcasting experience.  He proved to be a natural, however, and lost no time in establishing himself as the most sought after commercial broadcaster. The impact of his voice and style before the microphone captivated the hearts of listeners. He joined Radio Ceylon at a time when the station was ruling the airwaves, right across the Indian sub-continent.The announcers of Radio Ceylon enjoyed star status in South Asia.

Corea climbed the management ladder and in the 1990s he was appointed Director-General of the Sri Lanka Broadcasting Corporation.  While there, he succeeded in bringing a resurgence to Sri Lankan radio. Corea has been given numerous tributes and awards through the years. He is included in the list of notable individuals from the island of Sri Lanka.

Vijaya Corea is widely recognised as a pioneer in the introduction of Sinhala pop music at Radio Ceylon and the English Service. He was the one man who allocated time for indigenous songs at Radio Ceylon, via his radio programmes such as Saturday Star and Lanka's Talent in Focus.  He has continued that effort throughout his career and has extensive knowledge of the history of Sinhala pop groups and songs. Musicians of that era could not hold an event without Corea, as his presence was an absolute must for the introduction.

He has The Distinction of being the first ever, to stand on the BMICH stage to present a musical evening and cultural pageant inaugurating the 5th Non-Aligned Summit Conference in the year 1976, which was designed for television and telecast 'live' on global television".

He also holds the unbroken record of presenting 16 sponsored programs per week,

Many professionals and others still recall how, in their youth, they would skip or delay attending classes in school and university to listen to Vijaya Corea's Morning Show programmes aired over radio.

Vijaya Corea has introduced over one hundred pop musicians to the recording studios at then-Radio Ceylon.  As one of his protégés, the late Stanley Peiris, recounted:

The "Fortunes," led by Peiris, played a popular composition by Clarence Wijewardene, "Kalu Kelle," on the twin saxophone. Wickremesuriya was convinced that the group would go far. While Peiris was directing music for Upul de Almeida's son Jude, he remarked with gratitude to the elder de Almeida, "If not for this man Vijaya, I would not be directing music for your son."

Television
Vijaya Corea has the unique distinction of being Sri Lanka's first TV presenter.  As a broadcaster, he single-handedly played an exclusive role in spotting gifted musicians and providing them a venue for their talents, thus opening doors for them to make both a career and a livelihood. Some of those who benefited from national exposure on his radio programmes include popular names such as Clarence Wijewardane, Annesley Malewana, Indrani Perera, the Gypsies and others too.

Awards and recognition

Star performers from Sri Lanka and abroad gathered together for the show Grand Salute to Vijaya Corea to pay a musical tribute to him on his 40th anniversary in electronic media and showbiz at the BMICH Conference Hall in Colombo on 6 August 2005. On that occasion, Sri Lankan star and London-based artiste Desmond de Silva presented a Lifetime Achievement Award to Corea from the Autism Awareness Campaign.

In September 2007, he was fêted in Melbourne by Sri Lankan musicians living in that country who acknowledged his contribution to their careers.

When the National Media Awards took place for the first time in Sri Lankan history, three Gold awards were given to: 
Veteran journalist D. F. Kariyakarawana in honour of his contribution to newspaper journalism,
Titus Thotawatte, the veteran filmmaker in honour of his contribution to the television media, and
Vijaya Corea in honour of his contribution towards the upliftment of the broadcasting media over a long period of time.

Personal causes
Wherever Corea has travelled, he has done whatever he could to raise awareness of autism, a neuro-developmental disorder affecting many children and adults in Sri Lanka. Corea has supported the work of the Autism Awareness Campaign UK and Sri Lanka.

Edirimanne Corea Family Union
Vijaya Corea is the Patron of the Edirimanne Corea Family Union, in Colombo, Sri Lanka.

See also
Radio Ceylon
Sri Lanka Broadcasting Corporation
List of Sri Lankan Broadcasters
Vernon Corea
Kiddies Corner
Dominicus Corea
Victor Corea
Edirimanne Corea Family Union

External links 
Sri Lanka Broadcasting Corporation
SLBC-creating new waves of history
Eighty Years of Broadcasting in Sri Lanka
 Vijaya Corea in Sinhala
Facebook Community Page on Vijaya Corea
Facebook Community Page on Radio Ceylon
Radio Ceylon Facebook Group

Living people
Sri Lankan radio personalities
Alumni of S. Thomas' College, Mount Lavinia
Vijaya
1943 births